Godrano (Sicilian: Cutranu) is a comune (municipality) in the Metropolitan City of Palermo in the Italian region Sicily, located about  south of Palermo.

Godrano borders the following municipalities: Corleone, Marineo, Mezzojuso, Monreale. The Rocca Busambra, elevation , is within the communal territory.

References

Municipalities of the Metropolitan City of Palermo